"Consequences" is a song by American singer Camila Cabello from her debut studio album, Camila (2018). It was written by Cabello, Amy Wadge, Nicolle Galyon and Emily Weisband, and produced by Emile Haynie and Bart Schoudel. "Consequences" is a piano-led ballad. Lyrically, it is about the impact of a partner that was in Cabello's life. The singer teased its single release by sending packages to fans on October 3, 2018. "Consequences" had two versions released as the album's third and final single on October 9, 2018. That same day, the album's original version was sent to US adult contemporary radio and a new orchestral version was released digitally. The orchestral version also impacted US contemporary hit radio on October 16, 2018 and US adult contemporary radio on October 22, 2018. Commercially, the song reached number one in Wallonia (Belgium). A music video for the orchestral version, directed by Dave Meyers, was released on October 10, 2018. A vertical video was also released, showing the singer singing in front of an orchestra. The song was performed on Le Rico Show sur NRJ, Good Morning America and the American Music Awards of 2018. It won the Best Lyrics award at the 2019 iHeartRadio Music Awards.

Composition
"Consequences" is a piano-led ballad. Lyrically, it is about the impact of a partner that was in her life. Sam Lansky of Time cited the song as a "heartfelt" track both lyrically and musically while applauding its "pretty-ballad" songwriting for showcasing Cabello's voice.

The song is performed in the key of C major in  time with a tempo of 105 beats per minute. Cabello's vocals span from G3 to A5.

Reception

Critical response
Alexis Petridis of The Guardian portrayed, "The piano ballad Consequences is an unexpected triumph: eschewing the usual melodramatics, Cabello’s vocal is controlled, delicate and affecting, while the accompaniment vaguely recalls – of all things – Asleep by the Smiths."
Writing for The Observer, Kitty Empire opined the track, "Consequences exhibits greater-than-average originality. 'Lost a little weight because I wasn't eating,' croons Cabello; 'loving you had consequences'." Dennis Leupold of Rolling Stone expressed, "this girl definitely puts more of her heart into the emo. Cabello has a real flair for melancholy piano break-up ballads, as in 'Consequences,' where she ponders the high price of love: 'Dirty tissues, trust issues.'" Jamieson Cox of Pitchfork stated that "The overwrought one-two punch of 'Consequences'—which sounds a little like her attempt at something like Rihanna's 'Stay'" Sam Lansky of Time applauded its "pretty-ballad" songwriting for showcasing Cabello's voice while citing the song as a "heartfelt" track both lyrically and musically.
Nick Levine of NME penned, "Stripped-down piano ballad ‘Consequences’ feels even more candid: she tells a former partner that 'loving you was dumb and dark and cheap,' and says she 'lost a little weight because I wasn't eating.'"

Music videos
A music video for the orchestral version, directed by Dave Meyers, was released on October 10, 2018. It featured an appearance by Dylan Sprouse. In the video, Cabello and Sprouse run around, kiss and make music together. Cabello walks around a park while reminiscing about the couple's relationship. As of June 2019, the music video for orchestra version has over 42 million views on YouTube and 80 million streams on Spotify.

A vertical video was released on November 13, 2018, on her official Vevo account. The video was previously a Spotify exclusive, released on October 30. The black-and-white video features Cabello singing in front of an orchestra in a studio, and as she writes and records the tune in the studio.

Accolades

Live performances
The song was performed at Le Rico Show sur NRJ, Good Morning America and the American Music Awards of 2018. It also appeared on the setlist for Cabello's Never Be the Same Tour and when she opened for Taylor Swift's Reputation Stadium Tour.

Cover versions
Lynnea Moorer performed the song on the fifteenth season of The Voice (U.S.), where she was a contestant during the third week. Cabello praised Moorer's "powerful" cover, which was accompanied by a piano, cello and violin. Writing for Billboard, Emina Lukarcanin described the performance as "enchanting", stating that her "voice gracefully reached both high and low notes as she dazzled in a green off-shoulder top and matching glittery eyeshadow".

Track listings

Credits and personnel
Credits adapted from the liner notes of Camila.

Recording
 Recorded at Windmark Studios, Santa Monica, California
 Mixed at MixStar Studios, Virginia Beach, Virginia
 Mastered at the Mastering Palace, New York City, New York

Personnel

 Camila Cabello – vocals, songwriting
 Amy Wadge – songwriting
 Nicolle Galyon – songwriting
 Emily Weisband – songwriting
 Emile Haynie – production
 Bart Schoudel – vocal production, recording
 Josh Kerr – piano
 Serban Ghenea – mixing
 John Hanes – engineering
 Dave Kutch – mastering

Charts

Certifications

Release history

References

External links

2018 songs
Music videos directed by Dave Meyers (director)
Songs written by Camila Cabello
Camila Cabello songs
Songs written by Amy Wadge
Songs written by Nicolle Galyon
2018 singles
2010s ballads
Songs written by Emily Weisband
Vertically-oriented music videos
Song recordings produced by Emile Haynie